Edward Pitkin Cowles (January 1815 – December 2, 1874) was a justice of the Supreme Court of New York.

Cowles, son of Rev. Pitkin Cowles and Fanny (Smith) Cowles, was born in North Canaan, Conn., January 1815.  He graduated from Yale College in 1836.  Early in 1837 he began the study of law in the office of the late Hon. Ambrose L. Jordan, of Hudson, N. Y. Two years later he was admitted to the bar, and began practice in Hudson, where his younger brother, David S. Cowles, was subsequently associated with him.  He had attained a prominent position in the bar of Columbia County when, in 1853, he removed his office to the city of New York.  In the spring of 1855 he was appointed Judge of the Supreme Court of New York. He resigned the appointment in the following winter, but was reappointed to fill a vacancy caused by the death of Judge Robert H. Morris. Subsequently, a claim having been made to the seat by Hon. Henry E. Davies by virtue of an election, Cowles retired in his favor, and was for several years occupied mainly in hearing cases as referee, but at length resumed general practice. He continued to reside in New York until about 1871, when he removed to Rye, Westchester County, where he was living at the time of his death. He left home in October 1874, for a visit to California, and there met with a slight injury, which resulted, while on his return, in his death, at Chicago, from gangrene, on December 2. Cowles married, in November 1852, Sarah, daughter of Justus Boies, Esq, of Northampton, Mass., by whom he had four sons, all of whom, with their mother, survived him.

1815 births
1874 deaths
People from Litchfield County, Connecticut
Yale College alumni
New York (state) lawyers
New York Supreme Court Justices
19th-century American judges
19th-century American lawyers